MD Rahman is an American politician from the town of Manchester in the state of Connecticut. He is the State Senator for Connecticut's 4th State Senate district, covering the towns of Andover, Glastonbury, Manchester, and Bolton. As of 2023, he serves as Chair of the Planning and Development Committee of the Connecticut State Senate. He is a member of the Democratic Party. He was also endorsed by the Working Families Party during his 2022 campaign. He is currently serving his first term, and was elected in November 2022.

Mr. Rahman is an immigrant to the United States, having been born in Bangladesh. Prior to running for the Connecticut State Senate, he worked as an entrepreneur and built multiple successful businesses in Connecticut. He is married and has three children.

References

Living people
Democratic Party Connecticut state senators
People from Manchester, Connecticut
Year of birth missing (living people)